Shadow is a 2018 Chinese wuxia film directed by Zhang Yimou. It was screened at the 75th Venice International Film Festival, the 2018 Toronto International Film Festival, and the 2018 BFI London Film Festival.

It was released in Australia, Canada, Ireland, New Zealand, the United Kingdom, and the United States in 2019.

Plot 
Years ago, the kingdom of Pei lost the important city of Jingzhou to the kingdom of Yang after the popular and brilliant Commander Ziyu (Deng Chao) lost a duel to the infamously unbeatable Yang Cang (Hu Jun). The King of Pei (Zheng Kai) is enraged after discovering that Ziyu has challenged Yang Cang to a rematch without authorization.  The King demands Ziyu and his wife, Xiao Ai (Sun Li), give him a performance on the guzheng (a Chinese plucked zither).  Ziyu refuses to play and instead cuts off his hair. He is then allowed to leave.

The king decides to marry his beloved sister Qingping (Guan Xiaotong) to Yang Cang's son Yang Ping (Leo Wu) to maintain peace between the two kingdoms.

It is revealed that Commander Ziyu is in fact a man he named Jingzhou; the real Ziyu was severely wounded in his past duel with Yang Cang and is still recovering in a hidden cave in his residence.  Jingzhou was taken and secretly trained as a "Shadow" by Ziyu's uncle for his uncanny resemblance to Ziyu.  Only Ziyu and his wife are aware of this arrangement. Jingzhou acts as Ziyu's double after the duel.  Ziyu plots to retake Jingzhou and needs the Shadow to accomplish this.  Ziyu promises to let Jingzhou return to his home and mother after he retakes Jingzhou.

The King decides to punish "Ziyu" and demotes him to commoner status despite the objection of other military officials. Before "Ziyu" leaves, the King demands to see the wound "Ziyu" received from Yang Cang's saber, insisting on applying an ointment. When "Ziyu" reveals the wound the King remarks that the wound looks fresh. "Ziyu" replies that the original wound has healed and this was a fresh cut to remind himself of the shame in the loss. An envoy reports that Yang Ping made a counteroffer to only take Qingping as a concubine. This is seen as an indignity by the court but the King accepts, to the disgust of Qingping. General Tian (Wang Qianyuan) openly calls the King's action spineless and resigns his commission.

Jingzhou, using a metal umbrella weapon, is repeatedly unsuccessful in his practice duels against Ziyu, who mimics Yang Cang's halberd technique.  Ziyu gets increasingly angry and abusive.  Xiao Ai suggests that Jingzhou fight using feminine moves and embrace the umbrella's representation of yin (the concept of yin in Chinese philosophy is associated with darkness, water, and femininity), which would serve as a more effective counter to Yang Cang's spear, which represents yang (associated with light, fire, and masculinity). Xiao Ai is able to demonstrate a counter to Yang's techniques using her moves. Jingzhou meets with Tian and instructs him to lead and train a hundred convicts that Ziyu had recruited.  Jingzhou brings Tian to meet with Ziyu who informs him of Jingzhou's existence and role.

Ziyu reveals to Tian that he plans to use his shadow to recapture Jingzhou by keeping Yang Cang occupied for three rounds.  After he recaptures the city he intends to be King and Tian will be the commander.  The night before the duel, Jingzhou confesses that he was prepared to do anything for Xiao Ai. Xiao Ai goes to Jingzhou that night and spends the night with him while being watched by Ziyu through a secret peephole.

Jingzhou travels by water to the Jingzhou City Pass for the duel on a floating duel platform. Below the platform are Tian and the hundred armed convicts. Tian is shocked to see Qingping among them, who stowed away on the boat. Tian and the convicts secretly swim under the storm gates and enter the city while Yang Cang and other officials are preoccupied with the duel. Jingzhou beats Yang Cang in the first round but is defeated in the next two rounds of the three-round match. Yang Cang offers to call it a draw, but Jingzhou, seeing that the Yang banner has not yet toppled, challenges Yang Cang to continue. Yang says that this will be to the death.

Using the new umbrella weapons, Tian and the convicts drive back Yang Ping and his soldiers, though both sides suffer heavy losses. Yang Ping guards the banner and duels Qingping mortally wounding her.  Yang Ping asks her why a woman would fight and when he goes closer to hear her she kills him with his wedding gift dagger. Tian topples the Yang banner.  Seeing this, Yang Cang becomes enraged and proceeds to beat Jingzhou thoroughly.  As Yang Cang is about to strike the final blow using one of the umbrella blades, Jingzhou snaps the blade and kills Yang with the broken piece.  Jingzhou makes his way to his childhood home, but finds his mother stabbed to death. Several assassins surprise him in the house and try to kill him. The assassins are then killed by an emissary who says he represents the king. Jingzhou returns to the Pei capital. Assassins arrive at Ziyu's residence to attempt to assassinate him.

At the celebratory feast, the King of Pei abruptly orders everyone to leave except Jingzhou and Xiao Ai. He tells Jingzhou that he wants to reward him by making him and Xiao Ai - a fake couple - into a real couple. The King indicates that there will only be one commander Ziyu going forwards, a loyal one. A masked assassin enters the hall, carrying a box assumed to contain Ziyu's head, to the horror of Xiao Ai. When the king opens the box, however, it is empty. The assassin stabs the king, and removes his mask to reveal himself as Ziyu. Ziyu now raving, orders Jingzhou to kill the king, claiming the king was the one who ordered the death of Jingzhou's mother. As Jingzhou reaches for the king's sword, Ziyu attempts to stab Jingzhou but Jingzhou manages to mortally wound Ziyu. Jingzhou then puts the assassin's mask back on and uses Ziyu's sword to kill the King.  He then puts the sword in Ziyu's hand, framing him as the assassin.

Jingzhou exits the hall and declares to the gathered officials outside that the king has been assassinated and that he killed the assassin.  Tian does not seem to object.  The movie ends with Xiao Ai running to the doors of the hall in apparent shock and looking out through an opening, undecided whether to expose Jingzhou or accept the new status quo.

Cast 
 Deng Chao as Commander Ziyu and his shadow Jingzhou (based on Zhou Yu)
 Sun Li as Xiao Ai, wife of Ziyu (based on Xiao Qiao)
 Zheng Kai as King Peiliang (based on Sun Quan)
 Wang Qianyuan as Tian Zhan (based on Lü Meng)
 Hu Jun as Yang Cang (based on Guan Yu)
 Wang Jingchun as Lu Yan (based on Lu Su)
 Guan Xiaotong as Princess Qingping (based on Sun Shangxiang)
 Leo Wu as Yang Ping (based on Guan Ping)

Production 
Shooting began on March 18, 2017.

Film color 
All the costumes, props and scenes were rendered in black and white as much as possible to achieve the feeling of Chinese ink painting, but not pure black and white. Most of the actual scenes in the movie were shot on a real rainy day, directly controlling the colors physically and not using a computer to fade out the excess colors after shooting. This style of ink painting was something Zhang Yimou wanted to try years ago before "Shadow”

Home media
Well Go USA released the film  on DVD, Blu-ray, and 4K UHD in North America on August 13, 2019, and in the UK on September 16th, 2019.

Reception 
Shadow was celebrated by critics upon its release, with many praising its cinematography and set design. The website's critical consensus reads, "Beautifully filmed and inventively choreographed, Shadow is a thrilling and visually sumptuous wuxia epic that finds director Zhang Yimou near peak form." On Metacritic, the film has an average score of 81 out of 100, based on 25 critics, indicating "universal acclaim".

Awards and nominations

References

External links 
 
 Shadow on Douban 
 Shadow at Well Go USA Entertainment

2018 films
Chinese epic films
Films directed by Zhang Yimou
Le Vision Pictures films
Village Roadshow Pictures films
Chinese historical action films
2010s historical action films
Films with screenplays by Zhu Sujin
Wuxia films
Tencent Pictures films
2010s Mandarin-language films